Büchsenschinken is a district of the city Reinbek in the northern German state of Schleswig-Holstein. It was first settled by Johann Daniel Witten in 1825 as a small stop in the route between Hamburg and Mölln. The settlement has never been its own municipality but instead always part of Ohe and was thus integrated into Reinbek along with the rest of the former municipality in 1974.  

Büchsenschinken is home to the Hof Büchsenschinken horse stable as well as a small settlement of about 200 people.

History 
Büchsenschinken was first settled by Johann Daniel Witten from Witzhave in 1825 after he was granted permission by the office of Reinbek to build a timber-framed house in the area. After he acquired a license to distribute alcohol a few years later, his property developed into the inn Gasthof Büchsenschinken, a stop in the route betweenHamburg and Mölln. The inn, which was maintained by his descendens, was in operation until 2005 and demolished in 2008.

The small settlement consisted exclusively of the Witten family until 1945.

Büchsenschinken was incorporated into Reinbek, along with the rest of the former municipality of Ohe, during a 1974 territorial reform.

Trivia 

The name "Büchsenschinken" means literally "canned ham". Nothing seems to be known about the origin of the name.

References

External links 
Website of Reinbek (in German)
Museum association of Reinbek (in German)
The chronicles of Büchsenschinken (in German, archived)
„Man hatte uns völlig vergessen“ (in German, archived)
www.buechsenschinken.de (in German, archived)

Schleswig-Holstein
Stormarn (district)
